Hydrogenophaga is a genus of comamonad bacteria, several of which were formerly classified in the genus Pseudomonas.

References

Comamonadaceae
Bacteria genera